Pedro Alvarado Torres of Parral, Chihuahua was a mining magnate and philanthropist who operated the Palmilla mine near Parral in Chihuahua Mexico that was one of the country's richest silver mines.

He was married to Virginia Griensen Zambrano sp. The family became friends and supporters of Doroteo Arango (A.K.A. Francisco Villa) and looked after Villa's family after his assassination.

See also
Palacio de Alvarado

Sources
NY Times: Pedro Alvarado former laborer has rich Mexico mine
NY Times: Pedro Alvarado the simple hearted Silver King is no longer
Kentucky New Era: Mexican millionaire Pedro Alvarado's mania for pianos

Mexican businesspeople
Year of birth missing